Ahmed Mohamadina (born 10 March 1984, in Khemisset) is a Moroccan goalkeeper who plays for IR Tanger and Morocco's national football team.

References

1984 births
Living people
Moroccan footballers
Morocco international footballers
Difaâ Hassani El Jadidi players
Association football goalkeepers
People from Khemisset
Olympique Club de Khouribga players
Ittihad Tanger players
RS Berkane players